Jericho International Stadium is an association football stadium in Jericho, West Bank. It is the home stadium of the Hilal Areeha of the West Bank Premier League. The stadium seats 15,000 spectators.

References

Football venues in the State of Palestine
Buildings and structures in Jericho